The Sächsische Schweiz is a former district (Kreis) in the south of Saxony, Germany. Neighboring districts were (from west clockwise) Weißeritzkreis, the district-free city Dresden and the districts Kamenz and Bautzen. To the south it borders the Czech Republic.

History 
The district was created in 1994 when the two districts Sebnitz and Pirna were merged. In August 2008, as a part of the district reform in Saxony, the districts of Sächsische Schweiz and Weißeritzkreis were merged into the new district Sächsische Schweiz-Osterzgebirge.

Geography 
The district is named after the landscape - the Saxon Switzerland - as it is the most mountainous region of Saxony. To the west are the Ore Mountains, and to the east the Lausitzer Bergland (Lusatian Mountains). The river Elbe flows through the Elbsandsteingebirge and separates the two mountain ranges.

Coat of arms

Towns and municipalities

See also
Saxon Switzerland

External links

Official website (German)
Regional website (German)
Tourism website (German)
Official tourism portal of the destination Saxon Switzerland (English)
tourism portal regional info (German)

Saxon Switzerland